John Albert Watts (later known as John K. Watts, 21 January 1937 – 3 June 2017) was an Australian rules football player and radio broadcaster and television personality.

Early life
John Watts was born on 21 January 1937 in East Perth, Western Australia to Western Australia Police Superintendent James Albert Watts and Eileen Sylvia Watts.
He grew up in the Maylands area and attended Maylands State School (along with Graham Farmer). After graduating from school, he went to
work as an apprentice carpenter and joiner, later gaining a trade qualification in his mid-teenage years.

Upon reaching minimum recruitment age, John Watts joined the Western Australia Police (Police number: 2998) after successfully graduating from the WA Police Academy. 
John would serve in the Western Australia Police (while playing professional league football with East Perth Football Club) alongside many family members including his
Father, Uncles and cousins. To date, the Watts family remains one of longest and largest serving Police families in Australia.

John resigned from the Western Australia Police when he moved to Geelong, Victoria to play for the Geelong Football Club.

Football career 

John Watts' love of Australian rules football came at a young age when he would take the tram with his grandfather to Perth Oval to see East Perth Football Club play. With his dream of one day playing league football with his favourite club firmly in his mind, he signed up to play with the Bayswater Junior Football Club. It was during these years he worked on developing his skills as a footballer to be selected at the professional level. He was soon noticed and at a young age was selected to play in the Junior Reserves for his beloved East Perth Football Club.

To his football credit, after only playing a few reserves matches, Watts debuted for the East Perth Football Club on a half back flank against Subiaco at the age of 17 in 1954 and would become a regular player with the club.

Under Coach Jack Sheedy's guidance East Perth Football Club quickly became the outstanding side in the competition. East Perth made the Grand Final and won in 1956, 1958 and 1959, with John K Watts as Full Back in every one of these Premiership Teams along with Graham "Polly" Farmer. John Watts ended up playing 166 games as East Perth's primary fullback from 1954-1962.

After the 1962 season had finished with East Perth Football Club, John received many good offers from the then Victorian Football League (now Australian Football League) clubs of St Kilda, Essendon, and Geelong. Initially, John wanted to and was nearly selected to play for Essendon, but instead decided to follow his friend Graham Farmer to the Geelong Football Club.

On 6 July 1963 he was a member of the Geelong team that were comprehensively and unexpectedly beaten by Fitzroy, 9.13 (67) to 3.13 (31) in the 1963 Miracle Match. He went on to play for Geelong Football Club from 1963 until 1965 including their 1963 Premiership win over the Hawthorn Football Club. A Premiership win that Geelong Football Club would not win again until 44 years later in 2007. Although footage of John Watts' single-handed mark in the 3rd quarter of the Premiership match became the signature piece of footage from the 1963 Grand Final at the time, it was the club theme song that he penned for the Club to use if they won (which they did) that would become his lasting legacy. The club theme song is still played today at all games won and Premiership wins with Watts' original lyrics.

In 1966, Watts moved to Tasmania to Captain/Coach the Hobart Football Club. In his first year in this role he led them to a premiership. This success would make him the only Australian rules football player to have played in three premiership sides, for three different teams, in three different states. He retired from playing football in 1968.

Although a highly respected player, he is possibly best remembered for his off-field antics, and could be described as the epitome of a "club man". He was always found at all the club's social events entertaining everyone with his stand up routine or "belting" out a tune on the piano. Both these qualities would prove beneficial in his later career.

It was during these events that he wrote several club anthems. He wrote the East Perth Football Club, Swan Districts and Geelong Football Club theme songs.>

In March 2008 he was inducted into the West Australian Football Hall of Fame.

Media career 
After leaving football, Watts went on to have a successful career in radio and television.  Over 30 years he worked for various television and radio stations and was a popular comedian. John wrote most of his own material and would go on to write jokes for famous comedians such as Bob Hope and Harry Secombe and published magazines and joke books.

Watts appeared on TVW 7's first televised Football Panel and World of Sport segments (hosted by Ross Elliott) for many years. He would also present the Football and Sports review on Channel 7 News and was a regular entertainer and panelist on TVW 7's Telethon.
 
He also contributed articles to various Perth Newspapers on Sport and would also "ghost write" several sport-related articles. He was also a popular commentator for Football matches both on radio and television.

Dynamic Duo 

During the early 1970s, John Watts was approached by George Chapman (then head of Perth Radio Station 6PM) to form a variety style radio program. The proposal was to team up with popular DJ and talented radio producer Barry Martin to create this new style of show. It was originally slotted in the morning hours as a trial and would not disrupt the popular and highly rated afternoon and early evening programs.
At this time, the morning slots were considered unpopular by radio announcers and it was therefore relatively easy for Watts and Martin to have unrivalled "air-time" during these hours.

Unknowingly and with no intention of doing so, Watts and Martin had created one of the first "Breakfast Shows". It proved to be a hit with the public and within only six months, most people were waking up to the "Watts and Martin Breakfast Show" and the ratings reflected their instant popularity.

By the late Seventies they became known as the Dynamic Duo and were a popular and familiar face in Australian broadcasting. They became both famous and infamous with their larrikin type antics and special brand of humour. Such instances of calling the State Premier early on a Wednesday morning to talk about Football or "giving away free tickets to sail on the Queen's Yacht up the Swan River" when she visited, became part of broadcasting comedic history. They helped welcome in Qantas Airways' first B747 into Perth, the Australind Train Service to Bunbury and the renewed Indian Pacific Train Service (to which John Watts penned another song).

Eventually as ratings soared, the late Kerry Packer asked John and Barry to come and work for him. They were allowed more commercial freedom and had access to the latest equipment and studios. It was during this time that they were at the height of their success in the early 1980s and they ended up becoming the only Breakfast Radio Program in Australia to ever hold more than 50% of the population in ratings. This record still stands today.

Although politically incorrect and often controversial for its time, Watts always maintained that it "was all in good fun". His jokes often pointed fun at other sporting codes, politicians, other footballers (see Mal Brown) and himself. He has been regarded by many as the forerunner to modern Football Panel and Breakfast Radio style programs and most of his methods are still widely used today that he developed when television was in its formative years.

Business career
Watts later went on to actually own several of Perth's top radio stations and hotels. 
He ended up becoming a very successful businessman in Western Australia with interests in many football, horse-racing and hotel ventures.

At one stage during this time, he came up with the idea of integrating a West Australian team into the then Victorian Football League. 
Initially, Watts wanted to use East Perth Football Club as it already had the support base and infrastructure, but this idea was later boycotted by rivals in the then- West Australian Football League.
Watts managed to get together several prominent businessmen including Lindsay Fox and Alan Delaney to put forward the idea. This proposal would later become the West Coast Eagles.
The only current reference to Watts' involvement in the creation of the West Coast Eagles is in fellow footballer and friend John Todd's biography.

Personal life
John Watts has three daughters (Joanna, Donna who was tragically killed in 1995 and Venessa) and two sons (Luke and Jonathon) and nine grandchildren and two great grandchildren plus two step children Laurise and Michael
His first wife, Babette is the mother of Joanna, Donna, Luke and Venessa.  Babette was formerly Babette Taylor, daughter of the Taylor's Jewelry family, they married in 6th November 1958 and divorced in 1978. 
John's second wife Dale Kerr is the mother of Laurise and Michael and Jonathon.  Married on 10th October 1981 and divorced in 1999.  Dale changed her name after the divorce to Dale James. 

His third wife Lorraine Eastman married in Vegas in 2000 and resided in the coastal city of Scarborough in Western Australia over-looking the Indian Ocean.

In November 2011, he was diagnosed with a form of bone cancer, after previously having a malignant melanoma removed from the back of his neck during his football players days and prostate cancer in 2000. He continued to make guest appearances and to write jokes. He died on 3 June 2017, aged 80.

Discography

Studio albums

See also
 1963 Miracle Match

References

External links

"'Fair dinkum, unbelievable' loss" : John K. Watts on Davis

1937 births
2017 deaths
East Perth Football Club players
Geelong Football Club players
Geelong Football Club Premiership players
Hobart Football Club players
Hobart Football Club coaches
West Australian Football Hall of Fame inductees
Australian radio personalities
Australian rules footballers from Perth, Western Australia
One-time VFL/AFL Premiership players